The Iraqi Army Aviation Command is one of the formations of the Iraqi Armed Forces, founded in 1980. It manages and commands the helicopter class as well as the class of Unmanned aerial vehicle (UAVs). It is a completely separate force from the Iraqi Air Force, currently led by the Lieutenant General Samir Zaki. It has had important and impressive roles in most of the Iraqi army's wars after its establishment such as the first Iran–Iraq War, the Gulf War and its role in Iraq's war on terrorism in supporting ground forces, providing air cover in battles and targeting terrorist movements. This force reached its climax at the end of the first Gulf War, when the commanding cadres consisted of nearly 900 different helicopters.

History 
Helicopters have been a part of the arsenal of global armies since their creation. For the most part their use was limited to transportation of personnel and logistical support to rugged areas which are difficult to reach by ground equipment or conventional aircraft.

During the Vietnam War, and as a result of the American forces engagement with battle in bushes and harsh terrain, light weapons were added to American helicopters for close air support operations, and that was the creation of armed attack aircraft.

With the technological development and the start of the use of unmanned aircraft, some armies began to use these types of aircraft under the command of army aviation.

Origination Of Aviation Command 
Army aviation is a very precise specialization, and few countries have army aviation because of the accuracy it requires in completing  the tasks entrusted to it. At the beginning of the nineteen eighties and with the beginning of the Iran-Iraq war, it became necessary to separate army aviation from the air force in the sense that the helicopters are preoccupied with the army's aviation, and are assigned their own tactical missions, while the air force is preoccupied with strategic duties. This resulted in the formation of the Iraqi Army Aviation Command in 1980.

The 90s 
After the Iraqi invasion of Kuwait and its military repercussions in the second Gulf War (Desert Storm), the Army Aviation Command lost much  of its equipment in military operations and Iraq was unable to rebuild its military force as a result of the United Nations decision to blockade Iraq and the deterioration of the state of readiness for equipment and personnel.

after 2003 
After the United States and its allies invaded Iraq in 2003 and the civil administrator, Paul Bremer, decided to dissolve and rehabilitate the Iraqi army, the Army Aviation Command was dissolved and most of the military, logistical equipment and lots of infrastructure was dismantled. The United States then reconstructed the Army Aviation Command and supplied it with the necessary military equipment, logistics and rehabilitation of bases and airports.

Organization

Command 
Army Aviation Command Headquarters: Baghdad

Academies and training centers 
Army Aviation College

The College of Aviation is one of the formations of the Army Aviation Command. The college habilitates, prepares and trains pilot officers in various specialized and military sciences and skills, including navigation, flight theories, air conditioning, English language, communications and various military lessons in order to prepare them to work in all squadrons and air bases and continue performing their tasks in combating terrorism and defending the country. The college consists of five wings: Aviation, Teaching, Technical, Administration, supplies and Military Training.

Bases and airports 
The Army Aviation Command uses military bases and airports scattered throughout Iraq.

Personnel

Army Aviation Command Commanders

Ranks 
The ranks of the army aviation force are the same as the standard armed forces ranks, and because the army's flight force is derived from the air force, it inherited the ranks of the air force and comes with epaulets of sky blue color and below the epaulettes are two wings of an eagle (indicating the pilots), technical officers, engineers and ground crews have the same rank form with the wings of an eagle. The wings of the eagle are on the red stripe in the case of the staff officer, the epaulettes used to be the olive drab or khaki of the Army but with wings.

Officers

Soldiers and Warrant officers 
Soldiers and warrant officers in Army Aviation Command constitute are the ground crew, responsible for set and preparation of the aircraft on the flight line as well as ground guidance. they are not flying the aircraft, so the epaulette have no eagle's wings. The soldier's uniform does not contain epaulettes.

Equipment

Helicopters 
This force reached its climax at the end of the first Gulf War, when the commanding cadres numbered nearly 900 different helicopters. 
The armament of the Iraqi army was generally from the eastern bloc. As a result of the policies followed by the Iraqi state, most of the helicopters were Soviet. After 2003 the United States armed the Iraqi army aviation with American and Western helicopters.

In October 2012, it was reported that Iraq had signed a contract with Russia to purchase weapons, including approximately 30 Mil Mi-28 helicopters. The agreement was confirmed on October 9. Part of the deal was later canceled due to the Iraqi parliament's condemnation of the deal on suspicion of corruption, but the Iraqi Defense Minister stated that "the deal will go ahead". The contract was already signed and included the Mil Mi-28NE helicopters, and deliveries began in September 2013. Another 10 aircraft of the same model were delivered in January 2014.

The Army Aviation currently owns 175 operational helicopters, including 15 attack helicopters, out of 300 purchased, including 67-114 heavy attack helicopters (it is scheduled to reach 500 helicopters), as follows:

Unmanned Aerial Vehicles (UAVs) 

Iraq has contracted for 14 CH-4 medium-altitude and long-range (M.A.L.E.)

Losses of helicopters destroyed during the fight against ISIS

References 

Iraqi Ground Forces
Army aviation